Sherpur  is a town in Bogra District in the Rajshahi Division, Bangladesh. It is the administrative headquarter and urban centre of Sherpur Upazila.

References

Populated places in Bogra District